The Wuhan Street Circuit is a street circuit in the Chinese city of Wuhan, the capital of the province of Hubei.

History 
The Wuhan Street Circuit is located around the Wuhan Sports Center, a large sports complex in the city. The street circuit was first used in 2017, when the penultimate race weekend of the China Touring Car Championship (CTCC) was held in Wuhan. The races were won by Robert Huff and Zhendong Zhang.

In 2018, the race weekend was extended alongside the CTCC with the TCR China Touring Car Championship and the Chinese Formula 4 Championship, while with the World Touring Car Cup (WTCR) the first international event was attracted. It was the second Chinese event on the WTCR calendar, after having already been on the Ningbo International Circuit a week earlier.

References

World Touring Car Championship circuits
Motorsport venues in Hubei
Sports venues in Wuhan